You Zhangjing (born September 19, 1994) also known as Azora Chin is a Malaysian singer and songwriter based in mainland China. He was the main vocalist of Chinese boy group Nine Percent created by 2018 Chinese survival show Idol Producer. He released his first solo single Yesterday in 2018.

Personal life
You Zhangjing was born and raised in Johor, Malaysia. His early education was in the Chinese schools in Batu Pahat. His family consists of his father, mother, a younger sister and him. He moved to China to be in the undergraduate programme of pop music in the University of Nanjing Arts.

Endorsements 
Ninepercent was an endorser for many popular brands in China - Innisfree, PizzaHut and Fendi in 2018, Individually, You Zhangjing was chosen to be the endorser and spokesperson for chewing gum brand, Wrigley's, and skin care brands, Mistine, Tripollar and Snail White and Hong-Kong based food brand Wan Chai Ferry Peking Dumplings. In early 2019, he was chosen to represent technology giant Panasonicand since early June, he has been appointed the spokesperson of Tropicana China. He has also been appointed the spokesperson for Wrigley's two years in a row.

Filmography

Variety shows

Discography

Extended plays

Singles

Collaborations

Awards and nominations

Notes

References

External links

Weibo
尤长靖studio on YouTube

1994 births
Living people
People from Batu Pahat
Malaysian people of Chinese descent
Idol Producer contestants
Nine Percent members
Malaysian Mandopop singers
21st-century Malaysian male singers
Malaysian expatriates in China
21st-century Chinese male singers